The 1981–82 IHL season was the 37th season of the International Hockey League, a North American minor professional league. Seven teams participated in the regular season, and the Toledo Goaldiggers won the Turner Cup.

Regular season

Turner Cup-Playoffs 

Semifinals

External links
 Season 1981/82 on hockeydb.com

IHL
International Hockey League (1945–2001) seasons